The Citroën C4 and C6 models were designed to replace the Citroën Type A 10 hp and Citroën Type B model family cars. The styling of the two models was said to be heavily influenced by American counterparts of the same time period, however in France, the new model was considered just that: new. 

The traditional grill styles of previous Citroën models were abandoned and a sleeker, flatter grill was used. There were numerous options in terms of body styles, including a particularly popular commercial line. These nameplates were later used for the Citroën C4 and the Citroën C6 in the 21st century, although being classified into the different class. Sedan delivery and coupe utility vehicles were also produced under the Type AC4 index, in the basis of these vehicles, but were eventually replaced by the Citroen Type 23 trucks.

References 

C4 C6
Cars introduced in 1928